Raymond Fowler may refer to:

Raymond D. Fowler (1930–2015), American psychologist
Raymond E. Fowler (born 1933), American ufologist